I've Seen Everything is the second studio album by Scottish band The Trash Can Sinatras, released by Go! Discs in 1993. The album reached No. 50 on the UK Albums Chart.

Background
The album was recorded at the band's own 24-track studio, Shabby Road Studios in Kilmarnock and mixed at Orinoco Studios in London. Three singles were released from the album: "Hayfever" (No. 61 on the UK Singles Chart), "I've Seen Everything" and "Bloodrush" (promotional only).

Speaking to Glide Magazine in 2018, Francis Reader recalled of I've Seen Everything: "It's still one of the fans' favourites. It was a big step for us too, lyrically and musically. John started to write a lot more [and] Paul too. I was trying to keep up with people, really. They were writing great songs."

Critical reception

On its release, Tim Harrison of the Ealing Leader described I've Seen Everything as a "melodic, velvety concoction" with "a lot of subject matter" and "strong echoes of The Housemartins". He concluded: "I've Seen Everything [is] an economic, restrained and sensitive collection well worth listening to." The Irish Independent wrote: "Their debut was a fine beginning, but on its successor they've hardened their approach and broadened the scope of their songwriting. Whereas before they tended to sit back and admire their pretty chord structures, they're now audibly relishing the opportunity to get stuck in to the material."

Brent Ainsworth of the Santa Cruz Sentinel felt the album was "abundant [with] luscious, flowing pop", with the "softer songs" being best. David Mark of the Asbury Park Press commented: "Following up Cake would be difficult, but I've Seen Everything is an equally interesting effort from a very good group. While Cake was a bouncy album, I've Seen Everything is a notch more somber. The work, always interesting musically and lyrically, is something of a cross between The Beatles' Rubber Soul and XTC's Skylarking."

The St. Louis Post-Dispatch considered the album to "combine sweet tunes and acoustic settings with melancholy speculations about the could-be's, the would-be's and the stinging bees of life". Larry Printz of The Morning Call stated: "Full of great texture, swirling melodicism, and ironic songwriting, this Scottish band delivers the goods. This album has a greater depth than you'd expect from just jangly guitars." He highlighted "I'm Immortal", "Worked a Miracle" and "Killing the Cabinet" as three of the album's "notable tracks".

Peter Holmes of The Sydney Morning Herald described the album as "an inspired recording", which "jumps confidently from uneasy acoustic pop through chunky guitar revs and slow note picking". He highlighted "I'm Immortal" for containing "a chorus the Beatles would've been proud of", along with "One at a Time", which he considered to be "propelled by raging guitars, chaotic criss-crossed vocals and the lead guitar line of the year". Holmes added: "Shulman deserves praise for allowing the band to spray wide on the canvas; for an album to be all over the place yet strangely cohesive is no small feat."

Track listing

Personnel
The Trash Can Sinatras
 Francis Reader – vocals, guitar
 Paul Livingston – guitar
 John Douglas – guitar
 David Hughes – bass
 Stephen Douglas – drums

Additional musicians
 Sam Francis – vocals (track 9)
 Larry Primrose – piano (track 2), bongos (track 8)
 Allison Thomson – trumpet (track 12)
 Nick Ingham – string arrangements (tracks 1–2)

Production
 Ray Shulman – producer, engineer, mixing
 Larry Primrose – engineer, mixing

Other
 John Douglas – paintings
 Neil Cooper – photography

Charts

References

1993 albums
The Trash Can Sinatras albums
Go! Discs albums
London Records albums
Albums produced by Ray Shulman